Abongile Enoch Mnyaka (born 18 October 1993) is a South African rugby union player who most recently played with the  in the Rugby Challenge. His regular position is prop.

Career

Eastern Province Kings

Boland Cavaliers

He joined Wellington-based side  for the 2016 season.

References

South African rugby union players
Living people
1993 births
Eastern Province Elephants players
Rugby union props